Setor Complementar de Indústria e Abastecimento is an administrative region in the Federal District in Brazil.

See also
List of administrative regions of the Federal District

References

External links
 Regional Administration of Setor Complementar de Indústria e Abastecimento website
 Government of the Federal District website

Administrative regions of Federal District (Brazil)
Populated places established in 2004
2004 establishments in Brazil